Embley  may refer to:
 Persons
 Andrew Embley (born 1981), an Australian rules football player
 Edward Henry Embley (1861–1924), an Australian physician
 Mike Embley (born 1955), an English presenter on BBC World News

 Places
 Embley, Hampshire, a place in Hampshire, England
 Embley, Northumberland, a place near Devil's Water river in Northumberland, England
 Embley Park, a park near Romsey, Hampshire, England
 Embley (school), an independent school located in Embley Park
 Embley River, a river in Far North Queensland, Australia